Písková Lhota is a municipality and village in Nymburk District in the Central Bohemian Region of the Czech Republic. It has about 500 inhabitants.

Geography
It lies in a flat agricultural landscape in the Central Elbe Table. The Výrovka River flows along the western municipal border. There is an artificial lake called Pískovna. It was created by flooding a sandstone and gravel quarry. Today it is used for recreational purposes.

History
The first written mention of Písková Lhota is from 1553.

Transport
The D11 motorway (part of the European route E67) from Prague to Hradec Králové passes through the municipality.

Sights
There are no cultural monuments.

References

External links

Villages in Nymburk District